The women's 100 metre freestyle event at the 2016 Summer Olympics took place between 10–11 August at the Olympic Aquatics Stadium.

Summary
In one of the most unexpected results at these Games, Canadian teenager Penny Oleksiak and U.S. sprinter Simone Manuel pulled off an enormous upset from Australia's pre-race favorites Bronte and Cate Campbell down the home stretch to be in a dead heat for the gold medal. About midway of the final lap, both Oleksiak and Manuel came from behind to overhaul almost the entire field, before touching the wall simultaneously for an Olympic record in 52.70. Building a new milestone, Manuel became the first ever African-American female to earn an Olympic gold in swimming, while Oleksiak picked up her fourth medal to establish herself as Canada's most successful athlete at a single edition in Summer Olympic history. In later years, she set the record for the most career medals won by a Canadian summer Olympian.

Sweden's Sarah Sjöström captured the bronze with a 52.99 to complete a full set of medals at the Games, edging out Bronte Campbell (53.04) to fourth by a 0.05-second deficit. Dutch sprinter Ranomi Kromowidjojo missed her chance to defend the title with a fifth-place time in 53.08, while world-record holder Cate Campbell, who broke the existing Olympic record twice each in both the heats and semifinals earlier, slipped to sixth in 53.24. Manuel's teammate Abbey Weitzeil (53.30) and Denmark's four-time Olympian Jeanette Ottesen (53.36) rounded out the top eight.

Notable swimmers missed the final roster, including Brazil's home-crowd favorite Etiene Medeiros, Belarus' two-time Olympic medalist Aliaksandra Herasimenia, and Italy's Federica Pellegrini, who scratched the afternoon prelims earlier to focus on her 4×200 m freestyle relay duty instead.

In the victory ceremony, the medals for the competition were presented by James Tomkins, Australia, member of the International Olympic Committee, and the gifts were presented by Matthew Dunn, Australia, Bureau Member of FINA.

Records
Prior to this competition, the existing world and Olympic records were as follows.

The following records were established during the competition:

Competition format

The competition consisted of three rounds: heats, semifinals, and a final. The swimmers with the best 16 times in the heats advanced to the semifinals. The swimmers with the best 8 times in the semifinals advanced to the final. Swim-offs were used as necessary to break ties for advancement to the next round.

Results

Heats

Semifinals

Semifinal 1

Semifinal 2

Final

References

Women's 00100 metre freestyle
Olympics
2016 in women's swimming
Women's events at the 2016 Summer Olympics